Titanio pulchellalis is a moth in the family Crambidae. It was described by Staudinger in 1892. It is found in Uzbekistan.

References

Moths described in 1892
Odontiini
Taxa named by Otto Staudinger